The Africa Movie Academy Award for Best Documentary is an annual merit by the Africa Film Academy to reward the best short and feature documentaries for the year. It has been merged and renamed severally since it was first awarded in 2006 as Best Documentary.

References

Lists of award winners
Africa Movie Academy Awards
Documentary film awards